Napir-Asu (fl. 14th century BCE) was an Elamite queen, who was the wife of King Untash-Napirisha. A statue of her by the bronzeworkers of Susa is one of the finest examples of bronze metal-working to be discovered.

Biography 
Whilst Napir-Asu's parentage is not certain, it is likely that her father was the Babylonian king Burna-Buraish II, since there is a letter that has survives which describes Untash-Napirisha marrying a daughter of a Burna-Buraish. However there is some debate as to whether the Burna-Burnish in the letter is in fact the king, or a later descendant. 

Nevertheless it does appear that Napir-Asu was the first Elamite royal woman to be depicted on a limestone stele with her husband. She appears to also be the first Elamite queen whose name is inscribed on her body in statue form. The stele depicts Napir-Asu, Untash-Napirisha and his mother, the priestess Utik. Historians Kia Esfandyar and Kolsom Ghazanfari have argued that Napir-Asu held some power in her own right.

Statue 

In 1903 archaeologist Jacques de Morgan, working as part of the Délégation scientifique française en Perse, discovered a 130cm high statue, made of a bronze core, covered by a layer of copper, with cast and chased decoration, weighing 1750kg. It was found in the upper rooms of the temple of Ninhursag in Susa. It is also the largest example of Elamite bronze sculpture known. Since the statue was placed in the temple, curator Françoise Tallon has argued that the statue represented the queen in "perpetual prayer".

The statue was originally created with a series of processes that enabled the casting of its core and creation of its surface. The copper shell was created first by building a core of clay and bricks, which was then covered in wax, into which designs were made, followed by encasement in another layer of clay. Heated, so that the wax melted away, copper was then poured into the mould. Once the copper was cooled, the clay core was removed and layers of bronze were poured into the hollow of the body. At one time the surface may have been covered with gold and silver leaf. The statue's decorations are an important source for the study of Elamite textiles and clothing. The head and the left arm of the statue are missing.

On the fringed skirt of this statue, the names of the queen and the great gods of Susa are engraved in Elamite cuneiform. There is a ring on the queen's left hand, which is probably her wedding ring. On the skirt of this statue and in the language of the queen, a curse is written:I, Napir-Asu, wife of Untash-Napirisha. He who would seize my statue, who would smash it, who would destroy its inscription, who would erase my name, may he be smitten by the curse of Napirisha, of Kiririsha, and of Inshushinak, that his name shall become extinct, that his offspring be barren, that the forces of Beltiya, the great goddess, shall sweep down on him. This is Napir-Asu's offering.The statue is held in the Louvre collections. In 1993 the statue, alongside other works from the Louvre, was loaned to the Metropolitan Museum of Art for exhibition. It is recognised as a masterpiece of Elamite art.

References

External links 

 Statue of Queen Napir-Asu

Ancient queens consort
Elamite people
14th-century BC women